This article contains lists of official and potential third party and independent candidates associated with the 1996 United States presidential election.

"Third party" is a term commonly used in the United States in reference to political parties other than the two major parties, the Democratic Party and the Republican Party. An independent candidate is one who runs for office with no formal party affiliation.

Parties with ballot access in states holding 270 or more electoral votes are listed first in this article because 270 electoral votes represent a majority of the 538 electoral votes in the Electoral College.

Ballot access to all 538 electoral votes

Reform Party nomination

Reform candidates
 Ross Perot – party founder and businessman from Texas
 Richard Lamm – former Governor of Colorado
 David L. Boren – former Senator from and former Governor of Oklahoma (declined)
 Lowell P. Weicker, Jr. – former Senator from and former Governor of Connecticut (declined)
 Tim Penny – former Representative from Minnesota (declined)

The United States Reform Party had great difficulty in finding a candidate willing to run in the general election. Lowell Weicker, Tim Penny, David Boren and Richard Lamm were among those who toyed with the notion of seeking its presidential nomination, though all but Lamm decided against it; Lamm had himself come close to withdrawing his name from consideration.

Ultimately, the Reform Party nominated its founder Ross Perot of Texas in its first election as an official political party. Although Perot easily won the nomination, his victory at the party's national convention led to a schism as supporters of Lamm accused him of rigging the vote to prevent them from casting their ballots. This faction walked out of the national convention and eventually formed their own group, the American Reform Party, and attempted to convince Lamm to run as an Independent in the general election; Lamm declined, pointing out a promise he made before running that he would respect the Party's final decision.

Economist Pat Choate was nominated for Vice President.

Libertarian Party nomination

Libertarian candidates
 Harry Browne – writer and investment analyst from Tennessee
 Rick Tompkins – former candidate for senator from Arizona
 Irwin Schiff – writer and prominent figure in the tax protester movement from Nevada
 Douglas J. Ohmen – political activist from California
 Jeffrey Diket – political activist from Louisiana

The Libertarian Party nominated free-market writer and investment analyst, Harry Browne of Tennessee, and selected Jo Jorgensen of South Carolina as his running-mate. Browne and Jorgensen drew 485,798 votes (0.51% of the popular vote).

Ballot access to less than 538, but more than 270 electoral votes

Natural Law Party nomination

Natural Law candidate:

The Natural Law Party for a second time nominated scientist and researcher John Hagelin for president and Mike Tompkins for vice president. The party platform included preventive health care, sustainable agriculture and renewable energy technologies. During his campaigns, Hagelin favored abortion rights without public financing, campaign finance law reform, improved gun control, a flat tax, the eradication of PACs, a ban on soft money contributions, and school vouchers.

Hagelin and Tompkins drew 113,671 votes (0.12% of the popular vote).

U.S. Taxpayers' Party nomination

U.S. Taxpayers' candidates

 Howard Phillips, conservative political activist from Virginia
 Pat Buchanan, conservative columnist from Virginia (declined)
 Alan Keyes, Former Diplomat and political activist from Maryland (declined)
 Bob Dornan, Congressman from California (declined)

The U.S. Taxpayers Party had run its first presidential ticket in 1992, it being head by Howard Phillips who had failed to find any prominent conservative willing to take the mantle. In 1996 the situation ultimately proved the same, though Pat Buchanan for a time was widely speculated to be planning on bolting to the Taxpayers' Party should the expected Republican nominee, Senator Bob Dole, name a Pro-Choice running-mate. When Jack Kemp, who is Pro-Life, was tapped for the position Buchanan agreed to endorse the Republican ticket. Again, Phillips found himself at a temporary post that was made permanent, with Herbert Titus being nominated for the Vice Presidency.

Phillips and Titus drew 182,820 votes (0.19% of the popular vote).

Ballot access to fewer than 270, but more than 50 electoral votes

Green Party nomination

Green candidate:

The Green Party of the United States – Ralph Nader of Connecticut was drafted as a candidate for President of the United States on the Green Party ticket. He was not formally nominated by the Green Party USA, which was, at the time, the largest national Green group; instead he was nominated independently by various state Green parties (in some areas, he appeared on the ballot as an independent). Nader vowed to spend only $5,000 in his election campaign (to avoid having to file a financial statement with the FEC). Winona LaDuke, a Native American activist and economist from Wisconsin, was named as his running-mate.

Nader and LaDuke drew 685,128 votes (0.71% of the popular vote).

Workers World Party nomination

Workers World candidate:
 Monica Moorehead, school teacher and political activist

The Workers World Party nominated Monica Moorehead for president. Gloria La Riva, who had been on every ticket since 1984, was nominated for vice president.

Moorehead and La Riva drew 29,083 votes (0.03% of the national popular vote).

Socialist Workers Party nomination

Socialist Workers Party candidate:
 James Harris, political activist and revolutionary

The Socialist Workers Party nominated James Harris for president. Laura Garza was nominated for vice president.

Harris and Garza drew 8,476 votes (0.01% of the national popular vote).

Peace and Freedom Party nomination

The Peace and Freedom Party, largely based in California, nominated Marsha Feinland for the Presidency, while nominating Kate McClatchy for the Vice Presidency. Feinland and McClatchy received 25,332 votes (0.03% of the National Vote)

Ballot Access: California (54 Electoral)

Ballot access to fewer than 50 electoral votes

Socialist Equality Party nomination
The Socialist Equality Party nominated Jerry White for the Presidency and nominated Fred Mazelis for the Vice Presidency. White and Mazelis received 2,438 votes.

Ballot Access: Michigan, Minnesota, New Jersey (43 Electoral)

Socialist Party USA nomination
The Socialist Party USA nominated Mary Cal Hollis of Colorado and Eric Chester of Massachusetts. Hollis and Chester received 4,765 votes.

Ballot Access: Arkansas, Colorado, Oregon, Vermont, Wisconsin (35 Electoral)
Write-In Access: Florida, Indiana, Maryland, Massachusetts, Montana, Texas, Utah

Prohibition Party nomination
The Prohibition Party nominated Earl Dodge and Rachel Bubar Kelly. Dodge and Kelly received 1,298 votes.

Ballot Access: Arkansas, Colorado, Tennessee, Utah (30 Electoral)
Write-In Access: Illinois, Massachusetts

Grassroots Party nomination
The Grassroots Party nominated Dennis Peron. Peron received 5,378 votes.

Ballot Access: Minnesota, Vermont (13 Electoral)

American Party nomination
The American Party nominated Diane Beall Templin and Gary Van Horn. Templin and Van Horn received 1,847 votes.

Ballot Access: Colorado, Utah (13 Electoral)

Independent Party of Utah nomination
The Independent Party of Utah nominated Alma Peter Crane and Connie Chandler. Crane and Chandler received 1,101 votes.

Ballot Access: Utah (5 Electoral)

Independent candidates

Charles E. Collins
Charles E. Collins ran in the general election as an Independent after failing to attain the Republican or U.S. Taxpayers Party nominations for president. Rosemary Giumarra was his running mate. A group known as C.U.R.E. (Constitutionally Unified Republic for Everyone) also endorsed their candidacy. Collins and Giumarra received 8,941 votes (0.01% of the National Vote)

Ballot Access: Arkansas, Colorado, Mississippi, Tennessee, Washington (36 Electoral)
Write-In Access: Arizona, California, Georgia, Idaho, Indiana, Kansas, Maryland, Missouri, Montana, Utah

Steve Michael
Steve Michael ran as an Independent under the banner of the AIDS Cure Party, with Anne Northrup as his running mate. Michael and Northrup received 408 votes.

Ballot Access: Tennessee (11 Electoral)

References

 
1996 presidential candidates